Tiptree is a village and civil parish in the English county of Essex, situated  south-west of Colchester and around  north-east of London. Surrounding villages include Messing, Tolleshunt Knights, Tolleshunt Major, Layer Marney, Inworth, Birch, Great Braxted, Great Totham and Little Totham.

The placename 'Tiptree' is first attested in a charter of circa 1225, where it appears as Typpetre. The name means "Tippa's tree".

The population of the civil parish at the 2011 census was 9,152. The village has been expanding rapidly for several years with large numbers of new houses and estates being built, though it stills retains the title of being a village. The 'village' status was the subject of a local referendum in 1999 but residents and secondary school pupils rejected town status. Tiptree is amongst the contenders for the title of 'largest village in England'.

Tiptree has four primary schools: St Luke's Church of England Primary school, Milldene Primary School, Tiptree Heath Primary School and Baynard's Primary School. Thurstable School provides secondary and sixth form education. Messing Maypole Mill, a Grade II* listed tower mill, and the preserves company Wilkin & Sons, whose products use the village name as part of their brand, are located in the village.

Tiptree is within the City of Colchester and is administered by Tiptree Parish Council, Colchester City Council and Essex County Council. It is within in the Parliamentary constituency of Witham.

Tiptree was the site of the Tiptree sneeze, an event that occurred on 22 February 2014 at a concert by the London Central Fellowship Band at St. Luke's Parish Church where a trombonist sneezed into his trombone while playing. A video of the event was posted to YouTube and went viral in 2014.

Nature reserves 
Tiptree Heath lies to the south of Tiptree. The 25-hectare heath is the largest surviving fragment of heathland in Essex and is a Site of Special Scientific Interest. Historically the area was a focal point for smugglers, who used the secluded water inlets of Tollesbury, Salcott cum Virley and Mersea, and often hid their contraband within the overgrown heathland. Species found on the heath include Cross-leaved Heather (Erica tetralix), Bell Heather (Erica cinerea) and Ling or Common Heather (Calluna). To help maintain the heath, Dexter cattle are grazed there during the summer and a herd of hardy Exmoor ponies throughout the year. Tiptree Parish Field is a Local Nature Reserve.

Governance
An electoral ward in the same name exists. This ward had a population of 7,583 at the 2011 Census.

Economy
Tiptree is an internationally recognised brand of preserves manufactured in the village by Wilkin & Sons. The business was founded by the Wilkins, a local farming family in 1885. The company employs 220 full-time staff and has a turnover which exceeded £24 million in 2008.

Tiptree is the home of JobServe, the world's first online recruitment service, based on the Tower Business Park. They now employ around 100 local people. Started in 1993, the company has grown significantly and in 2006 the company processed in excess of 9 million job applications. The village is the head office of Underwoods Motor Group with both Ford and Vauxhall franchises. On the outskirts of Tiptree is Perrywood Garden Centre and Nurseries.

Religion
Within the Church of England, the village is part of the United Benefice of Tolleshunt Knights with Tiptree and Great Braxted. The parish church is Saint Luke's, located on Church Road, next to St Lukes CofE Primary School. The church celebrated its 150th anniversary in 2006.

Alongside the parish church, there are three other churches in the village, Kingsland Church, Tiptree United Reformed Church, and St John Houghton, a Roman Catholic church.

In nearby village of Tolleshunt Knights is the oldest and largest Orthodox Christian Monastery in Western Europe, the Patriarchal Stavropegic Monastery of St. John the Baptist. It was founded by Elder Sophrony, an Athos trained monk from Russia, in 1959.

Transport 
From about 1904 until 1951 the village was served by the Kelvedon and Tollesbury Light Railway (locally known as the Crab and Winkle Line). It was an early victim of the mid-20th century cutbacks to the British Rail network and Tiptree railway station closed in 1951. The nearest operational railway station is Kelvedon on the main Norwich to London Liverpool Street line.

Today, the village is bisected by the B1022 Colchester to Maldon road, and the B1023 Kelvedon to Tollesbury road. Tiptree is also close to the main A12 trunk road which passes through Essex. Bus services link the village to surrounding towns.

Climate
In East Anglia, the warmest time of the year is July and August, when maximum temperatures average around 21 °C (70 °F). The coolest time of the year is January and February, when minimum temperatures average around 1 °C (34 °F). East Anglia's average annual rainfall is about 605 millimetres , with October to January being the wettest months.

Notable residents 

Notable residents have included:

 John Joseph Mechi (1802-1880), silversmith, banker, inventor and Alderman of the City of London; owned, and died at, Tiptree Hall.

References

External links

Tiptree Parish Council

 
Villages in Essex
Civil parishes in Essex